Dirk von Lowtzow (born 21 March 1971) is a German musician. He has been the singer and guitarist with German rock band Tocotronic since 1994. Since 2001 he has also been active with the German electronic music project . In 1997, he took part in the compilation disc Musik für junge Leute with the song Charlotte, which refers to a L'Âge d'or label employee by that name.

Discography

Tocotronic 
 Digital ist Besser (1995)
 Nach der verlorenen Zeit (1995)
 Wir kommen um uns zu beschweren (1996)
 Es ist egal, aber... (1997)
 K.O.O.K. (1999)
 Tocotronic (2002)
 Pure Vernunft darf niemals siegen (2005)
 Kapitulation (2007)
 Schall und Wahn (2010)
 Wie wir leben wollen (2013)
 Das rote Album (2015)
 Die Unendlichkeit (2018)
 Nie wieder Krieg (2022)

Phantom/Ghost 
 Phantom/Ghost (2001)
 To Damascus (2003)
 Three (2006)
 Thrown Out Of Drama School (2009)

External links 

 Official homepage of Tocotronic (German)
 Fanpage of Tocotronic (German)

1971 births
Living people
21st-century German male singers
English-language singers from Germany
Musicians from Hamburg
People from Offenburg